The Artillery Mountains are a mountain range in Mohave County in western Arizona. Artillery Peak is at coordinates N 34.36946 W 113.58160 .

Mineral resources of the Artillery Mountains include manganese, uranium and gold. Rocher Deboule Minerals drilled their Artillery Mountains Manganese property in 2008, and discovered a resource of 2,553,000 tonnes of 3.82% Mn.

High Desert Gold acquired the Artillery Peak gold project in western Arizona in 2008.

At Uranium Energy's Artillery Peak uranium project, the firm hopes to discover a uranium deposit similar to the nearby Anderson Mine, which has a published reserve of 27 million pounds of uranium, in addition to a uranium resource of 70 million pounds, and another 80 million pounds of vanadium.

References 

Mountain ranges of Mohave County, Arizona
Mining in Arizona
Mountain ranges of Arizona